William Hulle may refer to:

William Hulle (MP for Salisbury), in 1399, MP for Salisbury
William Hulle (MP for New Shoreham), in 1397, MP for New Shoreham

See also
William Hull (disambiguation)